Carder England (born January 19, 1988) is an American professional poker player turned businessman from Lawrenceville, Georgia currently residing in Atlanta, GA.

Online poker
Known for beginning at the lowest stakes and grinding his way up from the bottom,  "+ to the EV!" PokerStars a.k.a. "SpazIsPlusEv" on Full Tilt Poker, England's multi table tournament online winnings exceeded $1,000,000, including multiple wins in the Full Tilt Poker $100 Rebuy tournament and multiple Sunday Major final tables including taking 4th place in the Full Tilt Poker Sunday Brawl and the 4th in the Poker Stars Sunday $500

Coaching 
England is a coach at pocketfives.com. He releases videos  and does coaching over the internet using Skype and Mikogo generally viewing hand histories and teaching his students optimal play.

Live poker

The World Series of Poker
England made his WSOP debut at the 2009 World Series of Poker with two cashes totaling $9,432.

In 2010, he cashed again twice for a total of $17,612.

Turning Stone Casino
England made his first live appearance at Turning Stone Casino. Not yet 21, he managed to cash his first event doubling his money at the Heartland Poker Tour and followed that up with two cashes at the Turning Stone Casino March Madness event the following year with his best finish being a 4th-place finish in the main event for $15,883

References

External links
 Pocketfives.com profile
 Cardplayer.com profile
 Twitter.com profile

American poker players
Living people
1988 births
People from Tucker, Georgia